Lietavská Svinná-Babkov is a village and municipality in Žilina District in the Žilina Region of northern Slovakia.

History
In historical records the village was first mentioned in 1393.

Geography
The municipality lies at an altitude of 420 metres and covers an area of 18.297 km². It has a population of about 1562 people.

References

External links
https://web.archive.org/web/20070513023228/http://www.statistics.sk/mosmis/eng/run.html

Villages and municipalities in Žilina District